Fountainview Academy is parochial boarding secondary school, located 17 miles south of Lillooet, British Columbia, Canada. It enrolls approximately 60 students in grades 10–12, primarily from the United States of America and Canada, but students also come from other countries, such as Korea, Germany, and Iceland.  It has a youth orchestra and choir and all students are required to participate in one and/or the other. The school is closely affiliated with but not owned and operated by the Seventh-day Adventist Church.

Philosophy of education
The book Education by Ellen G. White provides the principles which guide the Academy.  "Fountainview Academy strives to achieve its mission through a balanced program of vocational training and study. Each student is required to attend approximately 25 hours of classes and 18–20 hours of career and technical training each week as a means of translating theory into practice in the individual’s life."

Work experience and service activities
The high school includes an organic carrot farm which in 2008 was the largest producer of organic carrots in the province of British Columbia. The Adventist Church historically strongly advocated that students gain vocational training experience as part of their education. The carrot farm provides the students with such practical work experience. Students also meet their weekly career and technical training requirement by being assigned to various departments in campus development and upkeep, digital media, janitorial, cafeteria, or the office.

Controversy 
Fountainview Academy has come under fire from previous students accusing administration of engaging in the illegal practice of conversion therapy on LGBTQ+ students. The practice, while banned in Canada and discredited by the scientific community, went largely unchallenged in the face of Adventist anti-LGBTQ+ theology. The former students alleged that these highly destructive practices have contributed to negative mental health outcomes even after leaving Fountainview Academy. These student experiences were consistent with LGBTQ+ Adventist youth, who are among the highest risk minority populations in the denomination. A 2019 Parliamentary report from the University of British Columbia showed that 1-in-3 Canadians who had undergone conversion therapy later attempted suicide. On January 7, 2022, Canada banned conversion therapy on minors and adults nationwide, with violations carrying up to 5 years in prison. The ban raises questions about the conduct of the Academy as the new law outlines it is a criminal offense for "everyone who knowingly causes another person to undergo conversion therapy", according to the Canadian Criminal Code Section 320.101.

See also 

List of Seventh-day Adventist secondary schools

References

Sources
 Fountainview Academy Student Handbook 2009-2010

External links

Private schools in British Columbia
Lillooet
Fraser Canyon
Adventist secondary schools in Canada
High schools in British Columbia
Educational institutions established in 1975
1975 establishments in British Columbia
Boarding schools in British Columbia